Andrew Charles Theophanous (born 24 March 1946) is a Cypriot-born Australian former politician. He was an Australian Labor Party member of the House of Representatives from 1980 to 2000, and an independent member from 2000 to 2001. He is the author of three books and numerous articles on political theory and philosophy, especially in the areas of multiculturalism and social justice. He spent 21 months in jail for one charge of bribery of $2000, two charges relating to misuse of his position over one visa application, and another immigration matter. Theophanous pleaded not guilty to all charges and has always maintained his innocence. A Petition of Mercy application seeking a retrial on the three convictions is currently awaiting a decision from the Federal Government.

Early life
Theophanous was born in Polis Chrysochous, Cyprus, on 24 March 1946, to a Greek Cypriot father and a Greek mother, a refugee who had fled Nazi occupied Greece. He migrated to Australia at the age of eight, with his mother, brother Theo Theophanous and sister; his father had arrived three years earlier. He grew up in Broadmeadows in Melbourne, entered Monash University and graduated with a Bachelor of Arts with First Class Honours. He gained a B.Litt. from Oxford University and a Ph.D. in Philosophy from Melbourne University. In 1980, his first book Australian Democracy in Crisis: a radical approach to Australian politics was published by Oxford University Press. He became a lecturer in politics at Melbourne State College and later in social theory at Melbourne University. He also lectured at the University of Nevada, USA, and as Senior Teaching Fellow at Monash University.

Political career
Theophanous was first elected as the Labor member for the Melbourne electorate of Burke in 1980.  He switched to the new safe Labor electorate of Calwell in 1984. Theophanous was heavily interested in immigration matters, and from 1989 to 1993, was Chairman of the Joint Standing Committee on Migration. In this capacity, Theophanous' committee produced a number of reports on immigration policy. In one of these reports, 'Australia's Refugee and Humanitarian System: Achieving a Balance between Refuge and Control (1992)', Theophanous strongly supported granting permanent residence to 45,000 Chinese students and their dependents, who had been in Australia at the time of the 1989 Tiananmen Square protests in China. This view was later adopted by the Keating Government in November 1993. 

In March 1993, Theophanous was appointed Parliamentary Secretary to the Minister for Housing, Local Government and Community Services and Parliamentary Secretary to the Minister for Health. In December 1993, he was appointed Parliamentary Secretary to the Minister for Housing, Local Government and Human Services. Also, in December 1993, he was appointed Parliamentary Secretary to Prime Minister Paul Keating, who had enjoyed his support in two caucus leadership ballots, which made him unusual in the Left grouping, who mostly supported Bob Hawke. As Parliamentary Secretary to the Prime Minister, his main role was the promotion of the Access and Equity program within the Federal government departments.

Theophanous also wrote two more books: "Understanding Social Justice: an Australian perspective" (1994) ; and "Understanding Multiculturalism and Australian Identity" (1995). Both books were officially launched by Prime Minister Keating and were used in a number of academic courses.

Resignation
During 1998, a convicted heroin dealer working as an informant for the National Crime Authority (NCA) alleged that Theophanous was involved in migration fraud, and in July 1998 the NCA launched an investigation, codenamed Operation Legume. The major charge arising out of this was that Theophanous was involved in a conspiracy with the NCA informant to defraud the Commonwealth by making false representations in relation to attempting to bring the NCA’s informant’s Chinese girlfriend to Australia unlawfully. He was also charged with taking an unlawful inducement and soliciting an unlawful inducement.

Theophanous resigned from the Labor Party on 18 April 2000. His brother, Theo, condemned the resignation, calling it "an action taken by him with which I strongly disagree. I do not believe his actions are an appropriate response". At this time, Andrew Theophanous announced that he would serve out his term as an independent. During this period as an independent, he initiated a number of parliamentary motions on immigration, refugees, multicultural affairs and human rights. He recontested the seat as an independent candidate at the 2001 election.  He polled 9.6% of the vote, with the support of the Unity Party, but the seat was won by the new Labor candidate and former staffer, Maria Vamvakinou.

Theophanous was jailed in 2002 and sentenced to six years in prison with a minimum of 3.5 years. However, he served only 21 months. His barrister, Stephen Shirrefs SC, successfully appealed the conviction for conspiracy to defraud which resulted in the Supreme Court of Victoria quashing this major charge. 

The Commonwealth Director of Public Prosecutions (CDPP) then began a process of reinstituting the conspiracy charge. The pre-trial commenced in early 2006 and continued for three months. In her ruling of July 2006, in the County Court of Victoria, Judge Jeanette Morrish dismissed and permanently stayed the conspiracy charge. She said that Theophanous should not be retried on the charge to defraud the Commonwealth because the former National Crime Authority had withheld evidence crucial to his original case and subsequent appeal.  She also said 'the conduct of NCA officers who withheld documents for seven and a half years and despite 20 subpoenas was "grossly inadequate" and ... That conduct seriously calls into question the integrity of all previous proceedings'. The CDPP did not appeal the ruling.

As a result of the findings of Judge Morrish, Theophanous applied to the Commonwealth Attorney-General for the Governor-General to grant a retrial on the three remaining convictions under the Royal prerogative of mercy process.  The FOI process secured additional information being held by the successor of the NCA, the Australian Criminal Intelligence Commission, which had not been secured before the Trial, in spite of the subpoenas issued at the time.  As of 2021 a decision from the Federal Government on the prerogative of mercy has not been made.

Family
Theophanous is married to Dr. Kathryn Eriksson, an archaeologist and high school teacher. In November 2005, she was elected as a Brimbank Horseshoe Bend Ward Councillor. Theophanous' brother Theo Theophanous is a former state Labor politician. His niece Kat Theophanous is the current member for Northcote.

See also
Theophanous v Herald & Weekly Times Ltd

References

Further reading
 Theophanous, Andrew C. (1980), Australian democracy in crisis : a radical approach to Australian politics, Oxford University Press, Melbourne.  
 Lajovic, Misha and Theophanous, Andrew (1984), 'The major political parties and ethnic affairs,' in James Jupp (ed.), Ethnic Politics in  Australia, George Allen and Unwin, North Sydney, New South Wales. 
 Theophanous, Andrew C. (1994)(1993), Understanding Social Justice. An Australian Perspective, Second Expanded Edition, Elikia Books, Carlton South, Victoria. 
Theophanous, Andrew C. (1995), Understanding multiculturalism and Australian identity, Elikia Books, Melbourne. 

1946 births
Living people
Australian Labor Party members of the Parliament of Australia
Labor Left politicians
Australian people of Greek Cypriot descent

Cypriot emigrants to Australia
Members of the Australian House of Representatives
Members of the Australian House of Representatives for Burke (1969–2004)
Members of the Australian House of Representatives for Calwell
Naturalised citizens of Australia
Australian politicians convicted of fraud
People from Paphos
Independent members of the Parliament of Australia
21st-century Australian politicians
20th-century Australian politicians
People from Broadmeadows, Victoria
Politicians from Melbourne
Monash University alumni
University of Melbourne alumni
Academic staff of Monash University
Academic staff of the University of Melbourne
Academics from Melbourne